Farangis Yeganegi (Shahrokh)
(11 May 1916 Tehran – 13 February 2010 California) was the Founder and Director of Iranian Handicrafts Organization. She was also Assistant Secretary General of Women's Organization of Iran.

She has built a library in Tehran and named it after her deceased husband,"Ardeshir Yeganegi".

Life 
Farangis Yeganegi was born in 1916 in Tehran. Her, father Keikhosrow Shahrokh was the Zoroastrians representative in Iranian's parliament, and her mother was Firoozeh Farrahi. Yeganegi started her primary education in Iraj school which was for Zoroastrian pupils. She then Graduated from sage American College in Tehran. She received her Bachelor of Arts degree from the College of Literature at the University of Tehran. 

After that she traveled to United States and continued her education in Social work at the University of Southern California, obtaining her Master's degree.

In 1933 she married Ardeshir Yeganegi, the couple had three children named Firoozeh, Parviz and Kambiz. She later married the Indian Air Marshal and ambassador to Iran, Aspy Engineer.

See also 
 Keikhosrow Shahrokh
 Women's Organization of Iran
 Women's rights movement in Iran

References 

Iranian Zoroastrians
USC Suzanne Dworak-Peck School of Social Work alumni
1916 births
2010 deaths
University of Tehran alumni
Iranian women's rights activists
People from Tehran
Iranian emigrants to the United States